Stadionul Dr. Sinkovits is a multi-use stadium in Târgu Secuiesc, Romania. It is used mostly for football matches and is the home ground of KSE Târgu Secuiesc. The stadium was opened in the 1930s, after Aurel Sinkovits donated the ground on 6 August 1929. Sinkovits was the former club doctor and for its generous donation, he was chosen as the eternal honorary president of KSE Târgu Secuiesc. The stadium was renamed Municipal Stadium during the communist period, then after the 2000s it was renamed again after Sinkovits.

References

External links
Stadionul Dr. Sinkovits at soccerway.com

Football venues in Romania
Buildings and structures in Covasna County